Michalis Nikolakos or Mihalis Nikolakkos (Greek: Μιχάλης Νικολινάκος, 1923 – 1994) was a Greek theatrical and cinematic actor.  He was born in 1923 in Alyka, Laconia, in the southeastern Peloponnese.  In his childhood years, he moved to Piraeus.  After 1946, he studied both at the art school and the drama school of the Athens Odeum, where he had a student, the great Dimitris Rontiris. He was very famous as a cartoon artist as well, with works in magazines. He died in Athens in 1994.

Filmography

References
The first version of the article is translated and is based from the article at the Greek Wikipedia (el:Main Page)

External links 
 Official Site maintained by his son Nikos Nikolinakos www.nikolinakos.com

1923 births
1994 deaths
People from East Mani
Greek male actors
Greek writers
20th-century Greek male actors